Champaigne may refer to:
 Champagne
 Philippe de Champaigne

See also 
 Claude Champagne